Man without a Passport is a 1966 Soviet thriller film directed by Anatoly Bobrovsky.

Plot 
The film tells about the Soviet counterintelligence, trying to find and neutralize the spies who were sent to the USSR in order to obtain secret information about the construction of a large military-industrial complex...

Cast 
 Vladimir Zamansky as Aleksandr Ryabich (as V. Zamansky)
 Gennady Frolov as Vladimir Bakhrov (as G. Frolov)
 Nikolai Gritsenko as Pyotr Izmaylov (as N. Gritsenko)
 Lionella Skirda as Olga Goncharova (as L. Skirda)
 Alexey Eybozhenko as Konstantin Lezhnev (as A. Eybozhenko)
 Mikhail Pogorzhelsky as Vasily Fyodorovich Zubarev (as M. Pogorzhelsky)
 Vladimir Osenev as Fyodor Katko (as V. Osenev)
 Konstantin Tyrtov as Semyon Zabluda (as K. Tyrtov)
 Aleksei Sveklo as Oleychenko (as A. Sveklo)
 Viktor Pavlov as Gorokhov (as V. Pavlov)

References

External links 
 

1966 films
Films scored by Aleksandr Zatsepin
Russian adventure drama films
Russian thriller drama films
1960s Russian-language films
Soviet adventure drama films
Soviet thriller drama films